Barrie Tomlinson is a former editor and writer of British comics in the 1970s and '80s.

Tomlinson began his career at IPC Magazines in 1961, initially as a writer and then later as sub-editor on the comics Lion and then Tiger, becoming editor of the latter title in 1969. He later became the founding editor of the comics Roy of the Rovers (1976), Speed (1980), Scream! (1984), Wildcat (1988) and Teenage Mutant Hero Turtles (1990). He became Group Editor for Sports and Adventure in 1976, and oversaw the launch of the new Eagle in 1982, something for which he had long campaigned.

Tomlinson wrote most of the stories in Wildcat, as well as "Death Wish" for Speed, all of which continued to appear in Eagle after the cancellation of the comics in which they had originated. He also wrote "Survivor" for Eagle.

Tomlinson has written two books of memoirs about his career in the British comics industry:
 Real Roy of the Rovers Stuff, Pitch Publishing, October 2016
 Comic Book Hero, Pitch Publishing, September 2017

References

 "When Eagles Dared" by Karl Stock, Judge Dredd Megazine #389, 14 November 2017, p. 63
 "Cat O'Four Tales" by Stephen Jewell, in Judge Dredd Megazine #403, 15 January 2019, pp. 40–43.
 "Fast Fiction" by Stephen Jewell, in Judge Dredd Megazine #410, 20 August 2019, pp. 50–53
 "In Conversation With Barrie Tomlinson" at OldNDazed.co.uk

Living people
British comics writers
Fleetway and IPC Comics creators
Comic book editors
Year of birth missing (living people)